Lyndsay Morrison is a Canadian television personality for Bell Media. She is the Main Weather Anchor for CTV News Toronto. Previously she was the weather anchor for CTV NEWS AT NOON, CTV NEWS AT FIVE and CTV NEWS AT 6 for CTV Kitchener and the weekend morning radio host for 105.3 Virgin radio. She previously served as a fill-in weather and sports anchor for Jeff Hutcheson for CTV's Canada AM until it was cancelled in June 2016 and replaced by Your Morning in which she also serves as a fill-in weather forecaster. Previously she was a weather forecaster for The Weather Network. Morrison began her broadcast career as a features intern for ET Canada.

See also
 Ross Hull

References

External link

s
 https://toronto.ctvnews.ca/more/bios/lyndsay-morrison-1.4674631
 http://www.iheartradio.ca/virginradio/kitchener/shows/lyndsay-morrison-1.2584207

Canadian television meteorologists
Living people
Year of birth missing (living people)